Nimbi Jodha is a sub tehsil of Ladnu tehsil, Nagaur District of Rajasthan State, India. It belongs to Ajmer Division. It is located 75 km east of the district headquarters, Nagaur, and 51 km from Salasar Balaji.

History
Nimbi Jodha was established in the  16th century (1627). This village is named after the first settlers i.e. a Rajput family from the clan of Jodha Abhyaram ji. The story behind the name "Nimbi" is that  When Abhayram ji's group are resting under the tree of Kair they saw a Sheep under the tree of a Khejri, sheep gave birth a lamb and there was a wolf. Wolf want to catch the new born lamb but Sheep was fearless and ready to fight with Wolf, Wolf roaming around the Khejri tree but he can't catch the lamb and Wolf was gone. That time Bheel man in Abhyaram ji's group said "Ni-Bi"("Ni" means Nahi(No) & "Bi" means Dar(fear)), this place is fearless So he given the name NIMBI. Abhyaram ji decided staying here Nimbi and his clan was JODHA Rathore so village called Nimbi Jodha.  Abhyaram ji came from Sivana Barmer district. Mughal Emperor Akbar had attacked Sivana then Rajput's of Sivana did "Johar & Saka" and the other families of Rao Kalyandas left Sivana fort with a few little kids.

Hindus and Muslims make up most of the population .

Economy 
Agriculture was the main source of income in the past but with the passing of various National highways and state highways other economic activities are rapidly increasing.

Transport

Rail
The nearest railway station is Ladnun (LAU), part of the North Western Railway. Ladnun railway station is connected through a broad gauge line to Hissar, Rewari, Delhi, Jodhpur, Mumbai, Guwahati, Kolkata and Jammu Tawi.

Road
Nimbi Jodha is connected to all the major cities of Rajasthan and nearby states. A two-lane national highway NH-58 passes through the centre of town. NH-58 connects Nimbi Jodha with Nagaur and Salasar Balaji.

State Highway RJ SH 59 passes through the centre of town. It connects Nimbi Jodha with Sardarshahar and Ajmer.

Daily bus services are available from Nimbi Jodha to Jodhpur, Ahmedabad, Delhi, Jaipur, Surat, Hissar, Salasar Balaji, Kuchera, Sardarshahar, Bikaner, Jaiselmer, Haridwar, Udaipur, Banswara, Jhunjhunu, Hyderabad and Degana.

Air
The nearest airport to Nimbi Jodha is Jaipur International Airport, which hosts daily flights to Delhi, Mumbai, Hyderabad, Bangalore, Pune, Surat, Indore, Ahmedabad, Shirdi, Chennai, Guwahati, Kolkata, Udaipur, Varanasi, Agra, Dehradun, Cochin, Lucknow, Bhopal, Jaisalmer, Bikaner, Jodhpur, Bangkok, Kuala Lumpur, Dubai, Sharjah, Muscat. Air strip at Parihara village is available for small air craft.

Notables
Motilal Vora was an Indian politician supported the Indian National Congress (INC). He was the former Chief Minister of Madhya Pradesh.
Kishore Biyani is an Indian businessman. He is the founder and chief executive officer of Future Group and founded retail businesses such as Pantaloon Retail and Big Bazaar.

Administration
Nimbi Jodha is governed by a Panchayat Samiti, which comes under the Ladnun tehsil. The Sarpanch is Suman Khichar w/o Navaratan Kumar Khichar elected in 2020. Its Member of Legislative Assembly is Mukesh Bhakar (INC), elected in 2018 and its Member of Parliament is Hanuman Beniwal (Rashtriya Loktantrik Party/NDA) elected in 2019.

 Smt Suman Khichar (2020-)
 Sh.Shyam Sunder Panwar (2015-2020)
 Sh.Jhabbar Singh chauhan (2010-2015)
 Sh. Shri Ram Khichar (2005-2010)
 Smt Rami Devi khichar (2000-2005)
 Lt. Mahaveer Prasad Bohra (1995-2000)
 Lt. Ratan Das Swami (1975-1990)
 Lt. Nand Lal Pandiya
 Lt. Ummed Singh Jodha
 Lt. Chattar Singh sisodiya
 Lt. Bhikulal Sarda

Guest houses
Bhanwar Place (Sadar Bazar)
Satsang Bhawan (Bus Stand)
Bansi Atithi Bhawan (Near Govt School)
Govind Bhawan (Sadar Bazar)
Maheshwari Bhawan ( Near Govt Hospital)

Education
Nimbi Jodha has Senior Secondary Schools in English and Hindi Medium. After Senior Secondary Education Students may attend Sujla College Sujangarh, Bangur College Didwana, Jain Vishva Bharati Institute Ladnun in arts, commerce, and science faculties.

Colleges
Tagore College

Schools
Sh BLS Govt Sen. Sec. School
Navbharat Public School
Sunder Public School
Diksha Public School
Diksha Girls School
Saraswati Adarsh Vidhya Mandir
Adarsh Vidhya Mandir
Tagore Public School
Lord Krishna Public School
Naveen Vidhya Peeth
Nehru Bal Vidhya Mandir
New Fountain Public School
Govt Girls Sec School
Swami Vivekanand Govt. Model School
Govt Primary School
Sanskrit School
Bachpan Play School

References

Villages in Nagaur district